Igor Grivennikov (born 11 July 1952) is a Russian former swimmer who competed in the 1972 Summer Olympics and won a silver in the 4 × 100 m freestyle relay.

References

1952 births
Living people
Russian male swimmers
Russian male freestyle swimmers
Male backstroke swimmers
Olympic swimmers of the Soviet Union
Swimmers at the 1972 Summer Olympics
Olympic silver medalists for the Soviet Union
Olympic bronze medalists for the Soviet Union
Olympic bronze medalists in swimming
World Aquatics Championships medalists in swimming
Medalists at the 1972 Summer Olympics
Olympic silver medalists in swimming
Moscow State University alumni
Soviet male swimmers
20th-century Russian people
21st-century Russian people